Sterile neutrinos (or inert neutrinos) are hypothetical particles (neutral leptons – neutrinos) that are believed to interact only via gravity and not via any of the other fundamental interactions of the Standard Model. The term typically refers to neutrinos with right-handed chirality (see right-handed neutrino), which may be inserted into the Standard Model. Particles that possess the quantum numbers of sterile neutrinos and masses great enough such that they do not interfere with the current theory of Big Bang Nucleosynthesis are often called neutral heavy leptons (NHLs) or heavy neutral leptons (HNLs). 

The existence of right-handed neutrinos is theoretically well-motivated, because the known active neutrinos are left-handed and all other known fermions have been observed with both left and right chirality. They could also explain in a natural way the small active neutrino masses inferred from neutrino oscillation. The mass of the right-handed neutrinos themselves is unknown and could have any value between  GeV and less than 1 eV. To comply with theories of leptogenesis and dark matter, there must be at least 3 flavors of sterile neutrinos (if they exist). This is in contrast to the number of active neutrino types required to ensure the electroweak interaction is free of anomalies, which must be exactly 3: the number of charged leptons and quark generations.

The search for sterile neutrinos is an active area of particle physics. If they exist and their mass is smaller than the energies of particles in the experiment, they can be produced in the laboratory, either by mixing between active and sterile neutrinos or in high energy particle collisions. If they are heavier, the only directly observable consequence of their existence would be the observed active neutrino masses. They may, however, be responsible for a number of unexplained phenomena in physical cosmology and astrophysics, including dark matter, baryogenesis or hypothetical dark radiation. In May 2018, physicists of the MiniBooNE experiment reported a stronger neutrino oscillation signal than expected, a possible hint of sterile neutrinos. However, results of the MicroBooNE experiment showed no evidence of sterile neutrinos in October 2021.

Motivation

Experimental results show that all produced and observed neutrinos have left-handed helicities (spin antiparallel to momentum), and all antineutrinos have right-handed helicities, within the margin of error. In the massless limit, it means that only one of two possible chiralities is observed for either particle. These are the only helicities (and chiralities) allowed in the Standard Model of particle interactions; particles with the contrary helicities are explicitly excluded from the formulas.

Recent experiments such as neutrino oscillation, however, have shown that neutrinos have a non-zero mass, which is not predicted by the Standard Model and suggests new, unknown physics. This unexpected mass explains neutrinos with right-handed helicity and antineutrinos with left-handed helicity: Since they do not move at the speed of light, their helicity is not relativistic invariant (it is possible to move faster than them and observe the opposite helicity). Yet all neutrinos have been observed with left-handed chirality, and all antineutrinos right-handed. (See Chirality (physics)#Chirality and helicity for the difference.)

Chirality is a fundamental property of particles and is relativistically invariant: It is the same regardless of the particle's speed and mass in every inertial reference frame. However, a particle with mass that starts out with left-handed chirality can develop a right-handed component as it travels – unless it is massless, chirality is not conserved during the propagation of a free particle through space (nominally, through interaction with the Higgs field).

The question, thus, remains: Do neutrinos and antineutrinos differ only in their chirality? Or do exotic right-handed neutrinos and left-handed antineutrinos exist as separate particles from the common left-handed neutrinos and right-handed antineutrinos?

Properties
Such particles would belong to a singlet representation with respect to the strong interaction and the weak interaction, having zero electric charge, zero weak hypercharge, zero weak isospin, and, as with the other leptons, zero color charge, although they are conventionally represented to have a   quantum number of −1. If the standard model is embedded in a hypothetical SO(10) grand unified theory, they can be assigned an X charge of −5.

Due to the lack of electric charge, hypercharge, and color charge, sterile neutrinos would not interact electromagnetically, weakly, or strongly, making them extremely difficult to detect. They have Yukawa interactions with ordinary leptons and Higgs bosons, which via the Higgs mechanism leads to mixing with ordinary neutrinos. 

In experiments involving energies larger than their mass, sterile neutrinos would participate in all processes in which ordinary neutrinos take part, but with a quantum mechanical probability that is suppressed by a small mixing angle. That makes it possible to produce them in experiments, if they are light enough to be within the reach of current particle accelerators.

They would also interact gravitationally due to their mass, and if they are heavy enough, could explain cold dark matter or warm dark matter. In some grand unification theories, such as SO(10), they also interact via gauge interactions which are extremely suppressed at ordinary energies because their SO(10)-derived gauge boson is extremely massive. They do not appear at all in some other GUTs, such as the Georgi–Glashow model ( i.e., all its SU(5) charges or quantum numbers are zero).

Mass
All particles are initially massless under the Standard Model, since there are no Dirac mass terms in the Standard Model's Lagrangian. The only mass terms are generated by the Higgs mechanism, which produces non-zero Yukawa couplings between the left-handed components of fermions, the Higgs field, and their right-handed components. This occurs when the SU(2) doublet Higgs field  acquires its non-zero vacuum expectation value, spontaneously breaking its SU(2) × U(1) symmetry, and thus yielding non-zero Yukawa couplings:

Such is the case for charged leptons, like the electron, but within the standard model the right-handed neutrino does not exist. So absent the sterile right chiral neutrinos to pair up with the left chiral neutrinos, even with Yukawa coupling the active neutrinos remain massless. In other words, there are no mass-generating terms for neutrinos under the Standard Model: For each generation, the model only contains a left-handed neutrino and its antiparticle, a right-handed antineutrino, each of which is produced in weak eigenstates during weak interactions; the "sterile" neutrinos are omitted. (See neutrino masses in the Standard Model for a detailed explanation.)

In the seesaw mechanism, the model is extended to include the missing right-handed neutrinos and left-handed antineutrinos; one of the eigenvectors of the neutrino mass matrix is then hypothesized to be remarkably heavier than the other.

A sterile (right-chiral) neutrino would have the same weak hypercharge, weak isospin, and electric charge as its antiparticle, because all of these are zero and hence are unaffected by sign reversal.

Dirac and Majorana terms
Sterile neutrinos allow the introduction of a Dirac mass term as usual. This can yield the observed neutrino mass, but it requires that the strength of the Yukawa coupling be much weaker for the electron neutrino than the electron, without explanation. Similar problems (although less severe) are observed in the quark sector, where the top and bottom masses differ by a factor of 40.

Unlike for the left-handed neutrino, a Majorana mass term can be added for a sterile neutrino without violating local symmetries (weak isospin and weak hypercharge) since it has no weak charge. However, this would still violate total lepton number.

It is possible to include both Dirac and Majorana terms: this is done in the seesaw mechanism (below). In addition to satisfying the Majorana equation, if the neutrino were also its own antiparticle, then it would be the first Majorana fermion. In that case, it could annihilate with another neutrino, allowing neutrinoless double beta decay. The other case is that it is a Dirac fermion, which is not its own antiparticle.

To put this in mathematical terms, we have to make use of the transformation properties of particles. For free fields, a Majorana field is defined as an eigenstate of charge conjugation. However, neutrinos interact only via the weak interactions, which are not invariant under charge conjugation (C), so an interacting Majorana neutrino cannot be an eigenstate of C. The generalized definition is: "a Majorana neutrino field is an eigenstate of the CP transformation". Consequently, Majorana and Dirac neutrinos would behave differently under CP transformations (actually Lorentz and CPT transformations). Also, a massive Dirac neutrino would have nonzero magnetic and electric dipole moments, whereas a Majorana neutrino would not. However, the Majorana and Dirac neutrinos are different only if their rest mass is not zero. For Dirac neutrinos, the dipole moments are proportional to mass and would vanish for a massless particle. Both Majorana and Dirac mass terms however can appear in the mass Lagrangian.

Seesaw mechanism

In addition to the left-handed neutrino, which couples to its family charged lepton in weak charged currents, if there is also a right-handed sterile neutrino partner (a weak isosinglet with zero charge) then it is possible to add a Majorana mass term without violating electroweak symmetry.

Both left-handed and right-handed neutrinos could then have mass and handedness which are no longer exactly preserved (thus "left-handed neutrino" would mean that the state is mostly left and  "right-handed neutrino" would mean mostly right-handed). To get the neutrino mass eigenstates, we have to diagonalize the general mass matrix 

The matrix nominally assigns active neutrinos zero mass, but the  terms provide a route for some small part of the sterile neutrinos' enormous mass,  to "leak into" the active neutrinos.

Apart from empirical evidence, there is also a theoretical justification for the seesaw mechanism in various extensions to the Standard Model. Both Grand Unification Theories (GUTs) and left-right symmetrical models predict the following relation:

According to GUTs and left-right models, the right-handed neutrino is extremely heavy:  while the smaller eigenvalue is approximately given by

This is the seesaw mechanism: As the sterile right-handed neutrino gets heavier, the normal left-handed neutrino gets lighter. The left-handed neutrino is a mixture of two Majorana neutrinos, and this mixing process is how sterile neutrino mass is generated.

Sterile neutrinos as dark matter 
For a particle to be considered a dark matter candidate, it must have non-zero mass and no electromagnetic charge. Naturally, neutrinos and neutrino-like particles are a source of interest in the search for dark matter due to the possession of these two properties. It is more common today that theories rely on cold dark matter models (dark matter in the early universe is non-relativistic) as opposed to hot dark matter models (dark matter in the early universe is relativistic).  Therefore, the active neutrinos of the Standard Model are not likely to account for all dark matter due to their low mass. 

Since no bounds on the mass of sterile neutrinos are known, the possibility that the sterile neutrino is dark matter has not yet been ruled out, as it has for active neutrinos. If dark matter consists of sterile neutrinos then certain constraints can be applied to their properties. Firstly, the mass of the sterile neutrino would need to be on the keV scale, to produce the structure of the universe observed today.
Secondly, while it is not required that dark matter be stable, the lifetime of the particles must be longer than the current age of the universe. This places an upper bound on the strength of the mixing between sterile and active neutrinos in the seesaw mechanism.
From what is known about the particle thus far, the sterile neutrino is a promising dark matter candidate, but as with every other proposed dark matter particle, it has yet to be confirmed to exist.

Detection attempts
The production and decay of sterile neutrinos could happen through the mixing with virtual ("off mass shell") neutrinos. There were several experiments set up to discover or observe NHLs, for example the NuTeV (E815) experiment at Fermilab or LEP-L3 at CERN. They all led to establishing limits to observation, rather than actual observation of those particles. If they are indeed a constituent of dark matter, sensitive X-ray detectors would be needed to observe the radiation emitted by their decays.

Sterile neutrinos may mix with ordinary neutrinos via a Dirac mass after electroweak symmetry breaking, in analogy to quarks and charged leptons. Sterile neutrinos and (in more-complicated models) ordinary neutrinos may also have Majorana masses. In the type 1 seesaw mechanism both Dirac and Majorana masses are used to drive ordinary neutrino masses down and make the sterile neutrinos much heavier than the Standard Model's interacting neutrinos. In GUT scale seesaw models the heavy neutrinos can be as heavy as the GUT scale. In other models, such as the νMSM model where their masses are in the keV to GeV range, they could be lighter than the weak gauge bosons W and Z. A light (with the mass ) sterile neutrino was suggested as a possible explanation of the results of the Liquid Scintillator Neutrino Detector experiment. On 11 April 2007, researchers at the MiniBooNE experiment at Fermilab announced that they had not found any evidence supporting the existence of such a sterile neutrino. More-recent results and analysis have provided some support for the existence of the sterile neutrino.

Two separate detectors near a nuclear reactor in France found 3% of anti-neutrinos missing. They suggested the existence of a fourth neutrino with a mass of 1.2 eV. Daya Bay has also searched for a light sterile neutrino and excluded some mass regions.
Daya Bay Collaboration measured the anti-neutrino energy spectrum, and found that anti-neutrinos at an energy of around 5 MeV are in excess relative to theoretical expectations. It also recorded 6% missing anti-neutrinos. This could suggest either that sterile neutrinos exist or that our understanding of some other aspect of neutrinos is incomplete.

The number of neutrinos and the masses of the particles can have large-scale effects that shape the appearance of the cosmic microwave background. The total number of neutrino species, for instance, affects the rate at which the cosmos expanded in its earliest epochs: More neutrinos means a faster expansion. The Planck Satellite 2013 data release is compatible with the existence of a sterile neutrino. The implied mass range is from 0–3 eV. In 2016, scientists at the IceCube Neutrino Observatory did not find any evidence for the sterile neutrino. However, in May 2018, physicists of the MiniBooNE experiment reported a stronger neutrino oscillation signal than expected, a possible hint of sterile neutrinos.
Since then, in October 2021, the MicroBooNE experiment's first results showed no hints of sterile neutrinos, rather finding the results aligning with the standard model's three neutrino flavours. This result had not found an explanation for MiniBooNE's anomalous results, however.

In June 2022, the BEST experiment released two papers observing a 20-24% deficit in the production of the isotope germanium expected from the reaction  71Ga71Ge. The so called "Gallium anomaly" suggests that a sterile neutrino explanation could be consistent with the data.

In January 2023, the STEREO experiment published its final result, reporting the most precise measurement of the antineutrino energy spectrum associated with the fission of uranium-235. The data is consistent with the standard model and rejects the hypothesis of a sterile neutrino.

See also
 List of hypothetical particles 
 MiniBooNE at Fermilab
 Weakly Interacting Slender Particle

Footnotes

References

Sources

External links
 

 

 

 

Neutrinos
Hypothetical elementary particles
Dark matter